Jeong Dong-yun (born 3 April 1994) is a South Korean footballer who plays as full back for Gimcheon Sangmu F.C. in K League 1.

Career
He joined K League Classic side Gwangju FC in January 2016.

References

External links

1994 births
Living people
Association football defenders
South Korean footballers
Gwangju FC players
K League 1 players
Sungkyunkwan University alumni